Told You So is the second studio album of Danish singer Christopher released by EMI Denmark on 24 March 2014. The album peaked at number 2 on the Danish Albums Chart. Four singles had been released from the album: "Told You So", "Crazy", "Mama" and "Nympho". The first three singles reached the top ten on the Danish Singles Chart, peaking at number four, two and nine, respectively. The album sold 1,500 copies the first day in Denmark and 500 in Norway.

Track listing

Charts

References

2014 albums
Christopher (singer) albums